The magpie tanager (Cissopis leverianus) is a South American species of tanager. It is the only member of the monotypic genus Cissopis. As suggested by its common name, this blue-black and white species is superficially reminiscent of a European magpie. It weighs .

It is widespread in humid tropical and subtropical woodland, plantations, second growth, and parks in South America east of the Andes. It is absent from drier regions (such as the Caatinga) and most of north-eastern Brazil. In densely forested regions, it mainly occurs in relatively open sections (such as near major rivers). In such regions it is spreading with deforestation, which opens up the habitat. It is common throughout most of its range, but rarer in the Guianas.

Typically occurs in conspicuous, noisy pairs or groups of up to 10 individuals. Commonly takes part in mixed-species flocks. Often moves long tail up and down. Eats seed, fruits and insects. The cup-shaped nest is lined with grass, leaves or other plant materials and is located low in trees near the ground or in shrubs in dense vegetation. The 2 eggs are reddish-brown with brown spots. The incubation time is 12–13 days in captivity.

Taxonomy
The magpie tanager was formally described in 1788 by the German naturalist Johann Friedrich Gmelin under the binomial name Lanius leverianus. Gmelin's description was based on the "magpie shrike" that had been described in 1781 by the English ornithologist John Latham in his A General Synopsis of Birds. The type locality is Cayenne. The magpie tanager is now the only species placed in the genus Cissopis that was introduced in 1816 by the French ornithologist Louis Jean Pierre Vieillot. The genus name Cissopis combines the Ancient Greek kissa meaning "magpie" with -ōpis meaning "-faced". The specific epithet leverianus was chosen to honour the English collector Ashton Lever.

Two subspecies are recognised:
 C. l. leverianus (Gmelin, JF, 1788) – east Colombia and south Venezuela through the Guianas and Amazonian Brazil to central Bolivia
 C. l. major Cabanis, 1851 – Paraguay, southeast Brazil and northeast Argentina

References

 Restall, R., Rodner, C., & Lentino, M. (2006). Birds of Northern South America. Vol. 1 & 2. Helm, London.  (vol. 1);  (vol. 2).
 Ridgely, R., & Greenfield, P. (2001). The Birds of Ecuador - Field Guide. Cornell University Press.

External links
 Xeno-canto: audio recordings of the magpie tanager
 Magpie Tanager videos on the Internet Bird Collection

magpie tanager
magpie tanager
Birds of the Guianas
Birds of Colombia
Birds of Venezuela
Birds of the Amazon Basin
Birds of Brazil
Birds of the Ecuadorian Amazon
Birds of the Peruvian Amazon
Birds of the Bolivian Amazon
Birds of Paraguay
magpie tanager
magpie tanager
Taxobox binomials not recognized by IUCN